Ronald "Bon" Griffith MacDougall (or McDougall, August 4, 1901 in Winnipeg - December 11, 1970 in Riverside, California) was an American-based Canadian racing car driver and a founding member of the 13 Black Cats aerial stunt group (1924). 

One day in Los Angeles, an airshow was scheduled at the Burdette Airport and School of Aviation. When the performers did not show up, MacDougall, a part-owner of the airport, persuaded Matlock and Ken Nichols, two friends who had come to watch the show, to help him. According to Nichols, after five minutes of instruction, the pair performed as wing walkers, with MacDougall flying the airplane. The burgeoning field of aviation reached Hollywood, and stunt pilots were needed. In 1924, MacDougall, Nichols and Matlock formed a group called the Black Cats, later renamed the 13 Black Cats, to perform aerial stunts for movies. Each of the Black Cats was supposed to have a name that was 13 letters long, which is how MacDougall acquired the nickname "Bon". The group lasted five years, but eventually succumbed to increased safety regulations and cut-rate competition.

MacDougall competed in the 1926 Indianapolis 500 driving a Miller car. He completed 19 laps before retiring due to a water leak after 19 laps. MacDougall won $512 in that race.

According to the Internet Pinball Database, he designed five pinball games for the Pacific Amusement Manufacturing Company of Chicago and Bally Manufacturing Corporation in 1934 and 1935.  He received several patents for pinball game features during this period.

He became a US citizen in 1940.

Indy 500 results

See also
List of Canadians in Champ Car

References

External links
 ChampCarStats
 Internet Pinball Database

1901 births
1970 deaths
Canadian racing drivers
Racing drivers from Manitoba
Canadian emigrants to the United States
Sportspeople from Winnipeg
Indianapolis 500 drivers